Willow Creek is a  long tributary of the Snake River in the U.S. state of Idaho. South of the town of Ririe, the creek is impounded by Ririe Dam, forming Ririe Reservoir. Both forks reach the Snake River north of Idaho Falls.

Willow Creek has significant populations of brown trout.

See also
List of rivers of Idaho
List of longest streams of Idaho

References

Rivers of Idaho
Rivers of Bingham County, Idaho
Rivers of Bonneville County, Idaho